KRI Rigel (933) is the lead ship of the Rigel-class research vessels of the Indonesian Navy. Rigel is name of the brightest star in the constellation Orion. She is the most advanced military oceanographic ship in ASEAN.

Design 
The ships were built based on the BHO ship procurement contract carried out by the Ministry of Defense of the Republic of Indonesia with the French OCEA shipyard, and is made of aluminum with a weight of 560 tons with dimensions of 60.1 meters long and 11.5 meters wide. She is one of the warships owned by Indonesia, with special specifications for surveys in the ranks of the Indonesian Navy's Hydro-oceanographic Survey Unit. The ships are driven by two MTU Type 8V4000M53 propulsion engines which can produce a maximum speed of 14.0 knots, with a cruising range of 4400 nautical miles and is equipped with AUV (Autonomous Underwater Vehicle) equipment that functions to carry out underwater imaging up to a depth of 1000 meters and sends back. periodic data to the main ship in this case the BHO ship. In addition, they are also equipped with ROV (Remotely Operated Vehicle), SSS (Side Scan Sonar), Laser Scanner to get an overview of the land, AWS (Automatic Weather Station), Deep sea and Singlebeam Multibeam Echosounder, CTD (Conductivity Temperature and Depth) equipment, Gravity Corer, laboratory equipment and fishery survey capability. Rigel is the first ship of the MPRV (Multi Purpose Research Vessel) type to be operated in the ranks of the Indonesian Navy under the Hydro-Oceanographic Survey unit. This ship, one of the newest defense equipment owned by the Indonesian Navy, was built at the OCEA shipyard, Les Sables. d'Olonne, France.

The ship is also equipped with 20 mm and 12.7 mm submachine guns. This ship is for survey and mapping ship that is quite sophisticated because it is equipped with the latest hydro-oceanographic survey equipment that can be used for data collection up to the deep sea.

Construction and career 
The ship was laid down in October 2013 and launched on 11 December 2014 by OCEA Shipbuilding, France. She is commissioned on 11 March 2015. 

On 1 July 2021, her underwater multibeam echosounder technology has succeeded in detecting the presence of the Passenger Motor Ship (KMP) Yunice which sank in the waters of Bali. the ship was detected at position 8° 10' 31,864'' S - 114° 25' 42,986'' T at depths between 72 meters to 78 meters.

References

Ships built in France
2014 ships
Auxiliary ships of the Indonesian Navy
Research vessels